Eckardtsleben is a village and part of the town of Bad Langensalza in Thuringia, central Germany, with about 200 inhabitants.

Geography 
The village lies on both sides of a stream valley sloping down to the north-east. The Schwarzer Bach ("Black Brook"), which rises near Wiegleben, flows through the village from west to east and leaves the village as the Reifenheimer Graben ("Reifenheim Ditch") to flow into the Tonna a little below the Gräfentonna village mill. Since its source, the stream has travelled  and lost  in height. The intensively used flat-wavy terrain belongs to the arable farming area of the Thuringian Basin. The soils are fertile and mostly influenced by groundwater. Small erosion gullies, mostly vegetated, break up the landscape.

The Eckardtsleben stop on the Gotha–Leinefelde railway line is located to the south of the village.

History 
Eckardtsleben was first mentioned in a document on 1 June 932. The village belonged to the sub-county of the Tonna dominion, which from 1677 belonged to the Duchy of Saxon-Gotha-Altenburg as the "Amt Tonna".

The village has a rural character without multi-storey high-rise and new buildings and is characterised by agriculture.

Sights 
St Vitus' Church was built in 1404. Today, it is a Lutheran daughter church. The organ with one manual, one pedal and 8 stops was built by Gustav Koch.

References

External links 

Bad Langensalza
Former municipalities in Thuringia